Maplehurst Wood is a  biological Site of Special Scientific Interest on the northern outskirts of Hastings in East Sussex.

This wood has probably existed since the Middle Ages and a large part of it is still semi-natural. It has a variety of woodland types and a network of rides and streams. The wood is locally important for its breeding birds such as greater spotted woodpecker, tawny owl and nuthatch.

References

Sites of Special Scientific Interest in East Sussex